Antonio Vivaldi wrote a set of concerti for violin, strings and continuo, Op. 12, in 1729.

Concerto No. 1 in G minor, RV 317
Allegro
Largo
Allegro
Concerto No. 2 in D minor, RV 244
Allegro
Larghetto
Allegro
Concerto No. 3 in D Major, RV 124
Allegro
Grave
Allegro
Concerto No. 4 in C Major, RV 173
Largo spiccato – Allegro
Largo
Allegro
Concerto No. 5 in B Flat Major, RV 379
Allegro
Largo
Allegro
Concerto No. 6 in B Flat Major, RV 361
Allegro
Largo
Allegro

Concertos by Antonio Vivaldi